The Modern Language Bible carries the subtitle, The New Berkeley Version in Modern English; however, only the New Testament was revised.

This translation was a revision of an earlier translation by Gerrit Verkuyl.

According to the preface:  Approximately twenty-five years have passed since The Berkeley New Testament first appeared in 1945.  During this quarter century, the need for its revision has become evident.  As is inevitable with any Bible translation--and perhaps most of all with a one-man version--idiosyncrasies and other matters requiring correction have come to light.  In response, therefore, to suggestions and criticisms, the publishers appointed three experienced Bible scholars to revise The Berkeley New Testament, namely, E. Schuyler English, Litt.D., chairman; Frank E. Gaebelein, A.M., Litt.D.; and G. Henry Waterman, A.M., Ph.D.  The present edition is the result of their work.

Modern Language Bible
Modern Language Bible, The
1969 in Christianity